The  Bemidji Axemen season was the team's first season as a professional indoor football franchise and first in the Indoor Football League (IFL). One of nine teams competing in the IFL for the 2014 season, the Bemidji, Minnesota-based Axemen were members of the United Conference.

Founded in August 2013 as an expansion team, the Bemidji Axemen began play in February 2014 with the start of the 2014 IFL season. Under the leadership of co-owners Chris Kokalis and Ross Ladehoff plus head coach Robert Fuller, the team plays their home games at the Sanford Center in Bemidji, Minnesota.

Off-field moves
On October 14, 2013, the Axemen announced Robert Fuller as the team's first head coach. Fuller has eight years of indoor football experience, including the last two seasons as head coach of the Green Bay Blizzard. He was honored as the Indoor Football League Coach of the Year in both 2011 and 2012.

Bemidji acquired their field turf from a defunct IFL team in Ohio and refurbished and repainted the surface before their first home exhibition game. On January 20, 2014, the team announced that naming rights for the field were sold to the Leech Lake Band of Ojibwe for their Palace Casino and Hotel. As such, the team plays its home games on "Palace Casino Field inside the Sanford Center".

The team is working with medical and athletic training services provider Sanford Bemidji to monitor the condition of players for potential treatment of concussions and brain injuries.

Roster moves
On September 20, 2013, the Axemen announced the signing of their first player, kicker Scott Enos. He played college football with the University of Hawaii and his professional experience includes a stint with the Cedar Rapids Titans.

The team held public tryouts on November 23–24, 2013, at the West Saint Paul Regional Athletics Center in St. Paul, Minnesota. On December 3, the team announced the signing of offensive lineman Chuck Palonis, linebacker Jory Johnson, wide receiver Maurice Patterson, and defensive lineman Maurice Hamption.

On December 14, Bemidji signed defender DeQuan Starling, wide receiver Darnell Williams, and quarterback Joshua Aakre. The team also announced that they had acquired wide receiver Ryan Balentine in a trade for future considerations with the Green Bay Blizzard.

Awards and honors
On February 26, 2014, the IFL announced its Week 1 Players of the Week. Bemidji Axemen defensive back DeQuan Starling received an Honorable Mention for defense. On March 5, 2014, the IFL announced its Week 2 Players of the Week. Bemidji Axemen defensive back and kick returner De'Markus Washington each received an Honorable Mention for special teams play.

On March 19, 2014, the IFL announced its Week 4 Players of the Week. Bemidji Axemen quarterback Hunter Wanket was named as the Offensive Player of the Week. Wide receiver Ryan Balentine received an Honorable Mention for offense, linebacker Jory Johnson received an Honorable Mention for defense, and kick returner De’Markus Washington received a second Honorable Mention for special teams play. On March 26, 2014, the IFL announced its Week 5 Players of the Week. Bemidji Axemen wide receiver Nick Truesdell received an Honorable Mention for offense. Linebacker Jory Johnson received a second Honorable Mention for defense.

On April 2, 2014, the IFL announced its Week 6 Players of the Week. Bemidji Axemen linebacker Jory Johnson received his third Honorable Mention this season for defense. Kicker Zach Pulkinen received an Honorable Mention for special teams play. On April 16, 2014, the IFL announced its Week 8 Players of the Week. Bemidji Axemen defensive back De’Markus Washington received his third Honorable Mention of the season, but first for defense rather than special teams play. On April 23, 2014, the IFL announced its Week 9 Players of the Week. Bemidji Axemen wide receiver Ryan Balentine received an Honorable Mention for offense. Defensive lineman Montez Robinson received an Honorable Mention for defense. Kicker Zach Pulkinen received an Honorable Mention for special teams play.

Schedule
Key:

Pre-season

Regular season
All start times are local time

♥ Rescheduled from April 26 due to arena scheduling conflicts

Roster

Standings

References

External links
Bemidji Axemen official statistics
Bemidji Axemen at The Bemidji Pioneer

Bemidji Axemen
Bemidji Axemen
Bemidji Axemen